Daijiworld Media is an Indian company, headquartered in Mangalore, that provides news services, including the web portal, www.daijiworld.com . It was founded by Walter Nandalike, as www.daijidubai.com on 14 January 2001, primarily with the objective of relaying news from the Coastal Konkan region of India. It was later renamed as www.daijiworld.com, and established as a media company in 2007.

, Daijiworld's website had daily viewership of around 500,000 unique visitors from around 180 countries. The portal contains a variety of columns ranging from daily news, events, special columns, cookery, and other information covering Mangalore, Coastal Karnataka, Goa, Mumbai, and Middle-Eastern countries, apart from national news from authorized agencies. Daijiworld runs Daijiworld 24x7 TV channel, which was launched on 9 May as test transmission, telecast from 16 June 2014 across coastal Karnataka through cable network and set-top boxes. The TV channel is also available on Internet and also in Android and IOS app formats.

On the occasion of celebrating 20 years of Daijiworld.com, LOCALWOOD OTT platform has been launched jointly by Daijiworld and ATC Online. Streaming local-language content like Tulu, Konkani, Beary, Kannada movies and entertainment videos is the aim of this OTT platform.

History
Daijiworld Media was a result of an April Fools' Day prank by Walter Nandalike, the now Editor-in-chief of the portal. He had migrated to the Gulf for employment, with no knowledge of computers. Having learnt about computers, he sent his first E-mail to his friends on April 1, 2000, mentioning that he was hosting a site on the Internet. This was just meant to be a joke but his friends took him seriously and started enquiring about the site. Surprised by their curiosity, Walter started thinking seriously about the project. He learnt computers thoroughly, and eight months later, on 14 January 2001, launched www.daijidubai.com, primarily with the objective of hosting information and news pertaining to Konkani language and society. The portal is now known as www.daijiworld.com Daiji in Konkani means "relation", and the portal was started by Walter and a group of writers of the Daiji Dubai Writers Forum with a view to promote and spread awareness of culture and tradition.

In March 2007, it established itself as a media company under the banner of "Daijiworld Media Pvt Ltd". In order to cater to the increasing demand for news from India by the NRIs, an exclusive office was opened in Kankanady, Mangalore with 40 correspondents spread across the twin districts of Dakshina Kannada and Udupi. On 18 July 2008, Daijiworld took a step further and inaugurated its Udupi office. In May 2009, Daijiworld launched an English weekly tabloid named Daijiworld Weekly, promoted under the banner of a new company, "Daijiworld Publications Pvt Ltd".

In May 2014, Daijiworld moved to its own corporate office at Bondel, Mangalore. Daijiworld Television was also launched at the same time. On 10 September 2015, Daijiworld launched its fourth venture, Daijiworld Audio-Visual Studio. In May 2016, Daijiworld Udupi franchise moved to new premises, in addition to setting up its own television studio.

References

External links 

 

Mass media companies of India
Online companies of India
Mass media in Mangalore
Internet properties established in 2001